Erinnyis stheno is a moth of the  family Sphingidae. It is known from Barbados.

References

Erinnyis
Moths described in 1829